Coffee production in Panama was occurring in the Boquete Valley by the early 20th century, although coffee was growing wild all over the Pacific coast region of Panama by this time, when production did not match domestic consumption. The International Coffee Organization (ICO) has grouped mild arabica as the variety of coffee that is grown in Panama. The best quality of coffee in Panama is grown in Boquete. In the Coffee Review of 2008, two Panamanian coffees have received higher rating and fetched record prices than the coffee from Costa Rica. This is mainly due to the unprecedented success of the Geisha varietal. But only in 2004, its outstanding taste profile was recognized. In 2019 one pound of Panama Geisha beans fetched $1029 in an auction.

Plantations

The coffee varieties grown are 82 percent of arabica and 18 percent of robusta. The coffee produced here is said to be of a sharp taste, fragrant, with a mild degree of acidity. Among the estates producing coffee, the Café Ruiz is said to be one of the oldest and most regarded. Café Kotowa (Kotowa means "mountain"), a producer of boutique coffee, was established more than 100 years ago by a Scottish immigrant. Boquete has the largest coffee production factory in the country. Another notable plantation is the La Torcaza Estate, which is at an elevation of 1350 m in the southern slopes of Volcan Baru. It is an organically tended plantation where natural microorganisms are used.

Production

In 2013, according to FAO statistics, coffee production in the country was 10,100 tons which was about 0.1% of the world production. Coffee production statistics for the period 1961 to 2015 indicate a low of 402 tons in 1961 to 1422 tons in 1985, and in 2014 it was 510 tons. The indigenous groups known as Ngäbe and Buglé, who reside in the Chiriquí and Bocas del Toro provinces, are dependent on coffee production for their sustenance.

The Panamanian government ensures protection to coffee plants and crops from the effect of pests as it is one of the prime crops of export.

References

Bibliography

External links

Panama
Economy of Panama